Stefan Paweł Lasota (20 December 1910 – 28 April 1976) was a former Polish international footballer who played as a defender.

Career

Lasota started his career with the youth sides of Cracovia, progressing to the first team. Lasota played 10 years with the Cracovia first team, playing a total of 154 league appearances and scoring 2 goals. During his time with Cracovia he was part of the teams who won the I liga in 1930, 1932 and 1937, also finishing runners up in 1934. The start of the second World War put Lasota's playing career on hold. At the end of the year who joined newly formed BOP Baltia Gdańsk (later known as "Lechia Gdańsk") in 1945. While contracted to the club until 1947 he only played one game for Lechia, in a 5-3 win over KS Milityjny Gdańsk in 1945. After ending his playing career with Lechia, he held positions as a coach with Cracovia II, Lechia Gdańsk, KS Chełmek, Burza Wrocław, Unia Tarnów, Wisłoka Dębica, and Skra Warszawa.

International career

Lasota's only international appearance came for Poland on 2 October 1932 against Latvia national football team. Lasota played in the first half as Poland won the game 2-1.

Honours

Cracovia
I liga: 1930, 1932, 1937

References

1910 births
1976 deaths
MKS Cracovia (football) players
Lechia Gdańsk players
Polish footballers
Poland international footballers
Association football defenders